The Exies is the debut studio album by American rock band The Exies. It was released on March 28, 2000. following the album's release, the song Baby's Got a New Revelation was featured on the short-lived UPN show Gary & Mike.

Track listing

Personnel
 Musical
 Scott Stevens - vocals, guitar
 David Walsh - guitar
 Freddy Herrera - bass guitar
 Thom Sullivan - drums

 Technical
 Stephen Haigler - producer, engineer, mixing
 Joe Zook - producer, mixing
 Christopher Wade Damerst - producer, drum programming
 Gavin Lurssen - mastering
 Steve Marcusson - mastering
 Mark Comstock - artwork, art direction
 Chris Skane - art direction
 Lisa Johnson - photography
 Jeff Garner - photography

References

2000 debut albums
The Exies albums